This is a list of National Hockey League (NHL) players who have played at least one game in the NHL from 1917 to present and have a last name that starts with "A".

List updated as of the 2021-22 NHL season.

Aa–Al

Antti Aalto
George Abbott
Reg Abbott
Spencer Abbott
Justin Abdelkader
Clarence "Taffy" Abel
Gerry Abel
Sid Abel
Pontus Aberg
Dennis Abgrall
Ramzi Abid
Thommy Abrahamsson
Vitalii Abramov
Noel Acciari
Gene Achtymichuk
Doug Acomb
Keith Acton
Will Acton
Doug Adam
Luke Adam
Russ Adam
Bryan Adams
Craig Adams
Greg Adams (born 1960)
Greg Adams (born 1963)
Jack Adams (born 1895)
Jack Adams (born 1920)
John Adams
Kevyn Adams
Stewart Adams
Calen Addison
Rick Adduono
David Aebischer
Dmitri Afanasenkov
Bruce Affleck
Maxim Afinogenov
Jim Agnew
Kenny Agostino
Andrew Agozzino
Jack Ahcan
Fred Ahern
Rudy Ahlin
Sebastian Aho (born 1996)
Sebastian Aho (born 1997)
Peter Ahola
Chris Ahrens
John Aiken
Lloyd Ailsby
Brad Aitken
Johnathan Aitken
Andy Aitkenhead
Sami Aittokallio
Micah Aivazoff
Jason Akeson
Mika Alatalo
Tommy Albelin
John Albert
Andrew Alberts
Clint Albright
Gary Aldcorn
Keith Aldridge
Claire Alexander
Art Alexandre
Nikita Alexeev
Daniel Alfredsson
Akim Aliu
Jeff Allan
Frederic Allard
Bobby Allen
Bryan Allen
Chris Allen
Conor Allen
George Allen
Jake Allen
Keith Allen
Peter Allen
Vivan "Squee" Allen
Steve Alley
Dave Allison
Jamie Allison
Jason Allison
Mike Allison
Ray Allison
Wade Allison
Bill Allum
Ralph "Red" Almas
Cody Almond
Adam Almqvist
Olle Alsing
Mark Alt
Jorge Alves
Karl Alzner

Am–Ap

Dave Amadio
Michael Amadio
Peter Ambroziak
Mike Amodeo
Tony Amonte
Frederik Andersen
Bill "Red" Anderson
Craig Anderson
Dale Anderson
Doug "Andy" Anderson
Earl Anderson
Glenn Anderson
Jim Anderson
Joey Anderson
John Anderson
Josh Anderson
Lorne Anderson
Matt Anderson
Mikey Anderson
Murray Anderson
Perry Anderson
Ron Anderson (born 1945)
Ron Anderson (born 1950)
Russ Anderson
Shawn Anderson
Tommy Anderson
Jaret Anderson-Dolan
Erik Andersson
Joakim Andersson
Jonas Andersson
Kent-Erik Andersson
Lias Andersson
Mikael Andersson
Niklas Andersson
Peter Andersson (born 1962)
Peter Andersson (born 1965)
Rasmus Andersson
Steve Andrascik
Paul Andrea
Andy Andreoff
Lloyd Andrews
Dave Andreychuk
Sven Andrighetto
Alexander Andrijevski
Ron Andruff
Greg Andrusak
Mike Angelidis
Anthony Angello
Mel Angelstad
Lou Angotti
Darrell Anholt
Artem Anisimov
Hub Anslow
Victor Antipin
Mike Antonovich
Shawn Antoski
Nik Antropov
Ken Appleby
Mason Appleton
Syl Apps
Syl Apps Jr.

Ar–Ay

Al Arbour
Amos Arbour
Ernest "Ty" Arbour
Jack Arbour
John Arbour
Michel Archambault
Darren Archibald
Dave Archibald
Jim Archibald
Josh Archibald
Mark Arcobello
Ron Areshenkoff
Denis Arkhipov
Joel Armia
Bill Armstrong
Bob Armstrong
Chris Armstrong
Colby Armstrong
Derek Armstrong
George Armstrong
Murray Armstrong
Norm "Red" Armstrong
Riley Armstrong
Tim Armstrong
Chuck Arnason
Tyler Arnason
Jamie Arniel
Scott Arniel
Bill Arnold
Jason Arnott
Dean Arsene
Fred Arthur
Evgeny Artyukhin
John Arundel
Magnus Arvedson
Viktor Arvidsson
Arron Asham
Barry Ashbee
Don Ashby
Brent Ashton
Carter Ashton
Frank Ashworth
Tom Askey
Oscar "Ossie" Asmundson
Rasmus Asplund
Kaspars Astashenko
Mark Astley
Zach Aston-Reese
Hardy Astrom
Walt Atanas
Blair Atcheynum
Andreas Athanasiou
Cam Atkinson
Steve Atkinson
Bob Attwell
Ron Attwell
Nicolas Aube-Kubel
Jean-Sebastien Aubin
Norm Aubin
Serge Aubin
Pierre Aubry
Oscar Aubuchon
Adrian Aucoin
Keith Aucoin
Philippe Audet
Donald Audette
Les Auge
Justin Auger
Patrik Augusta
Alex Auld
Keith Aulie
Jared Aulin
Larry Aurie
Brady Austin
Yohann Auvitu
Sean Avery
Don Awrey
P. J. Axelsson
David Ayres
Vernon Ayres

See also
 hockeydb.com NHL Player List - A

Players